Vanessa De Melo Silva (born March 27, 1988) is a Brazilian mixed martial artist who competes in the Lightweight division. She is most known for her time spent fighting in the Ultimate Fighting Championship (UFC) and Professional Fighters League (PFL).

Mixed Martial Arts Career

Early career
Melo started her mma career fighting in various promotions in Brazil and amassed a record of 10–5 prior signed by UFC.

Ultimate Fighting Championship
Melo was welcomed into the UFC as a short-notice replacement by Irene Aldana at UFC on September 21, 2019. At the weigh-ins, Melo weighed in at 140 pounds, 4 pounds over the bantamweight non-title fight limit of 136. She was fined 30% of her purse and her bout with Aldana proceeded at a catchweight. Aldana won the fight by unanimous decision.

Melo's next fight was again a late-replacement fight against Tracy Cortez on November 11, 2019 in Sao Paulo at UFC Fight Night: Błachowicz vs. Jacaré.  At the weigh-ins, Cortez and Melo both missed weight for their fight, both weighing in at 136.5 pounds, 0.5 pounds over the bantamweight non-title fight limit of 136. The bout was initially proceeded at a catchweight and no fine was issued due to identical misses. However, later on the same day, Brazil's athletic commission (CABMMA) executive director Cristiano Sampaio announced that due to an error of the scale used at the weight-ins was set was 0.7 pounds above the official scale and thus both fighters were officially clear from missing weight and the bout proceeded at bantamweight. Melo lost the bout by unanimous decision.

Melo faced Karol Rosa at UFC 251 on July 11, 2020. She weighed in at 141 pounds, five pounds over the bantamweight non-title fight limit. She lost the fight via unanimous decision.

Melo was scheduled to face Sarah Moras on November 7, 2020 at UFC Fight Night 182. However, Moras tested positive for COVID-19 and the bout was postponed to take place at UFC on ABC: Holloway vs. Kattar on January 16, 2021. She won the fight via unanimous decision.

On February 4, 2021, it was announced that Melo was released from her UFC contract.

Professional Fighters League 
Melo faced Martina Jindrová on May 6, 2022 at PFL 3. She lost the bout via unanimous decision.

Melo faced Olena Kolesnyk on July 1, 2022 at PFL 6. She lost the bout via unanimous decision.

Championships and accomplishments
Standout Fighting Tournament
SFT Flyweight Championship

Mixed martial arts record 
 

|-
|Loss
|align=center|11–10
|Olena Kolesnyk
|Decision (unanimous)
|PFL 6
|
|align=center|3
|align=center|5:00
|Atlanta, Georgia, United States
|
|-
|Loss
|align=center|11–9
|Martina Jindrová
|Decision (unanimous)
|PFL 3
|
|align=center|3
|align=center|5:00
|Arlington, Texas, United States
|
|-
|Win
|align=center|11–8
|Sarah Moras
|Decision (unanimous)
|UFC on ABC: Holloway vs. Kattar
|
|align=center|3
|align=center|5:00
|Abu Dhabi, United Arab Emirates
|
|-
|Loss
|align=center|10–8
|Karol Rosa
|Decision (unanimous)
|UFC 251
|
|align=center|3
|align=center|5:00
|Abu Dhabi, United Arab Emirates
|
|-
|Loss
|align=center|10–7
|Tracy Cortez
|Decision (unanimous)
|UFC Fight Night: Błachowicz vs. Jacaré
|
|align=center|3
|align=center|5:00
|São Paulo, Brazil
|
|-
|Loss
|align=center|10–6
|Irene Aldana
|Decision (unanimous)
|UFC Fight Night: Rodríguez vs. Stephens
|
|align=center|3
|align=center|5:00
|Mexico City, Mexico
|
|-
|Win
|align=center|10–5
|Jan Finney
|Decision (unanimous)
|Battlefield FC 2
|
|align=center|3
|align=center|5:00
|Macau, SAR, China
|
|-
|Win
|align=center|9–5
|Mariana Morais
|Decision (split)
|Future FC 5
|
|align=center|3
|align=center|5:00
|São Paulo, Brazil
|
|-
|Win
|align=center|8–5
|Nilde Trindade
|Decision (unanimous)
|Future FC 2
|
|align=center|3
|align=center|5:00
|São Paulo, Brazil
|
|-
|Win
|align=center|7–5
|Daiane Firmino
|Decision (split)
|SFT 6
|
|align=center|3
|align=center|5:00
|São Paulo, Brazil
|
|-
|Win
|align=center|6–5
|Núbia Santos do Nascimento
|Decision (unanimous)
|SFT 5
|
|align=center|3
|align=center|5:00
|São Paulo, Brazil
|
|-
|Loss
|align=center|5–5
|Suvi Salmimies
|Decision (split)
|Cage 37
|
|align=center|3
|align=center|5:00
|Helsinki, Finland
|
|-
|Win
|align=center|5–4
|Molly McCann
|Decision (unanimous)
|XFC International 12
|
|align=center|3
|align=center|5:00
|São Paulo, Brazil
|
|-
|Win
|align=center|4–4
|Juliana Leite
|Submission (rear-naked choke)
|Gold Fight 7
|
|align=center|1
|align=center|4:01
|São Paulo, Brazil
|
|-
|Loss
|align=center|3–4
|Silvana Gómez Juárez
|Decision (unanimous)
|XFC International 8
|
|align=center|3
|align=center|5:00
|Campinas, Brazil
|
|-
|Loss
|align=center|3–3
|Vanessa Guimarães
|Decision (split)
|XFC International 6
|
|align=center|3
|align=center|5:00
|São Paulo, Brazil
|
|-
|Win
|align=center|3–2
|Gloria Bravo
|Decision (unanimous)
|XFC International 3
|
|align=center|3
|align=center|5:00
|São Paulo, Brazil
|
|-
|Win
|align=center|2–2
|Suelen Pereira
|Submission (rear-naked choke)
|Circuito Talent de MMA 5
|
|align=center|1
|align=center|3:37
|São Paulo, Brazil
|
|-
|Loss
|align=center|1–2
|Juliana Werner
|Decision (unanimous)
|MMA Super Heroes 1
|
|align=center|3
|align=center|5:00
|São Paulo, Brazil
|
|-
|Loss
|align=center|1–1
|Camila Lima
|TKO (punches)
|CT Fight
|
|align=center|1
|align=center|3:46
|São Paulo, Brazil
|
|-
|Win
|align=center|1–0
|Natalie Santos
|Decision (unanimous)
|Fight Stars
|
|align=center|3
|align=center|5:00
|São Paulo, Brazil
|
|-

See also 
 List of female mixed martial artists

References

External links 
 
 

1988 births
Living people
Ultimate Fighting Championship female fighters
Bantamweight mixed martial artists
Brazilian female mixed martial artists
People from Taboão da Serra